Khairul Annuar Abdul Kadir is a Malaysian international lawn bowler.

Bowls career
Kadir won a bronze medal in the men's pairs with Fairul Izwan Abd Muin at the 2010 Commonwealth Games in Delhi.

He won the triples bronze medal at the 2007 Asia Pacific Bowls Championships, in Christchurch, New Zealand.

References

Living people
1985 births
Bowls players at the 2010 Commonwealth Games
Commonwealth Games silver medallists for Malaysia
Malaysian male bowls players
Commonwealth Games bronze medallists for Malaysia
Commonwealth Games medallists in lawn bowls
Southeast Asian Games medalists in lawn bowls
Competitors at the 2005 Southeast Asian Games
Southeast Asian Games silver medalists for Malaysia
Medallists at the 2010 Commonwealth Games